Humberto Tan-A-Kiam (pinyin: Chén yàjiān born 26 October 1965), better known as Humberto Tan, is a Dutch radio and television presenter, sports journalist and writer of Surinamese descent.

Career 
After obtaining his vwo-diploma Tan studied law at the University of Amsterdam, where he obtained his law degree. He made his television debut on Sonja Barend's talk show as a member of De tafel van 7 (English: "The table of 7"). In 1991 the AVRO hired Tan as editor for the television program Forza TV, which he quickly after started presenting together with Jessica Broekhuis. Two years later he moved to Studio Sport and presented the NOS Journal for some time.

In 1999 and 2020 Tan was chosen as best dressed Dutchman by Esquire,

In 2005 Tan moved to the new television channel Talpa, where he was a sports expert at NSE and presenter of Café de Sport. On 12 July 2007 it was announced that Tan would be transferred to RTL Nederland, where he presented Sunday-night premier league soccer. In 2013 he made a guest appearance on the sketch show TV Kantine as Isaac from The Love Boat.

From 2008 until the summer of 2012 Tan presented De Wedstrijden from the pay TV channel Eredivisie Live. He did a voiceover for the Dutch version of the animation movie Surf's Up in 2007. In 2009 he provided the Dutch voice of Buck the Weasel in the movie Ice Age: Dawn of the Dinosaurs.

Tan appeared regularly on radio channel 538 when the usual DJ Edwin Evers was on vacation. He also was a substitute from 2008 to 2012 for the RTL4 TV program RTL Boulevard. From October 2010 to March 2012 Tan presented the program On the Move for BNR Nieuwsradio. Since 2012 it has been called BNR Humberto Tan. It was broadcast every workday from 6:00AM to 9:30AM.

From 26 August 2013 until 8 June 2018 Tan presented the TV talk show RTL Late Night on RTL 4. He presented this show more than a thousand times. Because of falling viewership ratings he was replaced by Twan Huys, who couldn't save the show from its eventual cancellation on March 4, 2019.

In 2014 Tan released a cd box with his favorite dancing music on it. This 'soundbook' is called Let's Dance and was converted into a live event. On 29 and 30 October 2015 Tan presented the first edition of Let's Dance in the Ziggo Dome.

In 2016 Tan won the first season of the program Jachtseizoen broadcast by StukTV. He was also the winner of the first season of the program The Perfect Picture, broadcast by RTL 4. In May 2018 it was announced that Tan would be the new presenter of the programs Dance Dance Dance and Holland's Got Talent. Since 2019 Tan has presented the show Voetbal Inside.

In January 2021, Tan returned with a new talkshow, Humberto, on Sunday evening, which ran through the summer. In February 2022, the show returned.

Charitable work 
Tan is a board member at the foundation Suriprofs & Slachtofferhulp Fund. Since 2002 he has also been an ambassador of the Dutch Red Cross, since 2016 an ambassador for the Johan Ferrier Fund, and since 2005 an ambassador for the World Wide Fund for Nature. Since 2015 he has been a board member for the Slachtofferhulp Fund. He is also an adviser for the Court in Overijssel. Tan was member of the Sportraad Amsterdam, an advisory body.

Television

Radio

Awards 
In March 2014 Tan was chosen by his colleagues as best TV Presenter at The TV-Screens. He also received in both 2014 and 2016 the Silver Televizier-Ster Man. On 25 January 2016 Tan was proclaimed by media magazine Broadcast Magazine as News Presenter of the Year 2015. In October 2016 he won the Sonja Barend Award.

Private life 
Tan's mother was the Surinamese-Dutch social worker and women's rights activist Hillegonda Justine "Hilly" Axwijk (nl; 1934–2004), who emigrated to the Netherlands with her children in 1967.

Tan has two daughters (born in 1997 and 2000) and one son (born in 2007).

Bibliography 

 2000 - Het Surinaamse legioen, Surinaamse voetballers in de eredivisie 1954-2000
 2002 - Het Kleine Verschil (a photo book for the Red Cross)
 2012 - Rondom Tan
 2014 - Rondom Tan woman
 2014 - Als winnen makkelijk was, zou iedereen het doen, Tan's best sport stories

References 

1965 births
Living people
Dutch writers
Dutch radio journalists
Dutch television journalists
Dutch sports journalists
Dutch radio presenters
Dutch television presenters
People from Paramaribo
Surinamese emigrants to the Netherlands
University of Amsterdam alumni
Nationaal Songfestival presenters